The Breathing Shadow is the first album by the Swedish rock band Nightingale. It was recorded and mixed within a week by Dan Swanö alone at his Unisound Studio; Nightingale did not yet exist as a band, and was simply a solo project by Swanö. This is the only album of Nightingale to use a drum machine (the other albums have Swanö or someone else on drums). The songs "Nightfall Overture" and "The Dreamreader" were re-recorded on the 2004 compilation album, Nightfall Overture.

Track listing

Personnel
Nightingale
 Dan Swanö - vocals, lead guitar, rhythm guitar, bass guitar, drums, drum machine, keyboards, mixing

Production
Peter in de Betou - mastering
Holger Stratmann - cover art, design, photography
Börje Forsberg - Executive producer

References

Nightingale (band) albums
1995 albums